Cornelis "Cees" Gravesteijn (born 21 April 1928) was a Dutch sprint canoer who competed in the late 1940s. At the 1948 Summer Olympics in London, he finished sixth in the K-2 1000 m event. He was born in Wormer.

References
Cees Gravesteijn's profile at Sports Reference.com

1928 births
Living people
Canoeists at the 1948 Summer Olympics
Dutch male canoeists
Olympic canoeists of the Netherlands
People from Wormerland
Sportspeople from North Holland
20th-century Dutch people